A partial lunar eclipse will take place on May 16, 2041.

Visibility

Member
This is the 25th member of Lunar Saros 141. The previous event was the May 2023 lunar eclipse.

Related lunar eclipses

Lunar year series (354 days)

Saros series

Metonic series
This eclipse is the fourth and final of four Metonic cycle lunar eclipses on the same date, May 15–16, each separated by 19 years.

See also
List of lunar eclipses and List of 21st-century lunar eclipses

Notes

External links

2041-05
2041-05
2041 in science